Edmonton House is a 45-storey building located in downtown Edmonton, Alberta. Opened as an apartment hotel, the building was re-branded into a hotel in 2006 before converting back in 2013. When it was completed in 1971 it was the second tallest building in Edmonton,  shorter than AGT Tower which topped out just months before.

See also
List of tallest buildings in Edmonton

References

External links
 Edmonton House website
Coast Edmonton House Emporis profile

Hotel buildings completed in 1971
Hotels in Edmonton
Skyscraper hotels in Canada
Skyscrapers in Edmonton
Residential skyscrapers in Canada
1971 establishments in Alberta